Lionel Lamy (29 December 1943 – 4 May 2018) was a French professional footballer who played as a defender and midfielder.

Career
Born in Le Loroux-Bottereau, Lamy played for Nantes, Cherbourg, Le Mans and Laval.

References

1943 births
2018 deaths
French footballers
FC Nantes players
AS Cherbourg Football players
Le Mans FC players
Stade Lavallois players
Ligue 1 players
Ligue 2 players
Championnat National players
Association football defenders
Association football midfielders
Footballers from Loire-Atlantique